Korfball was a demonstration sport at the 1928 Olympic Games in Amsterdam. It took place at the Olympic Stadium in Amsterdam at 6 August 1928. 
It was the second time that korfball was a demonstration sport at the Olympic Games. It was also a demonstration sport at the 1920 Olympic Games in Antwerp.

Match 
Two Dutch teams of 12 players played a match against each other at 6 August 1928. One team wore red-white shirts and the other team played in red-black shirts. The referee was H. W. Vliegen, LL. B. and the Assistant referees (linesmen) were G. Leeuw and W.C. Schaap, C.E..

The squads

References 

1928 Summer Olympics events
Korfball competitions
1928 in korfball
Korfball in the Netherlands